Scott Dureau (born 29 July 1986) is an Australian former professional rugby league footballer. A goal-kicking , he played for the Catalans Dragons in the  Super League and the Newcastle Knights in the NRL.

Background
Dureau was born in Taree, New South Wales, Australia.

Playing career

Newcastle Knights
As a young man, Dureau played his junior football for the Port Macquarie Sharks. In the early 2000s, the Newcastle Knights signed him on a deal that would see him playing in the lower grades. He won various awards at the club before making his debut against the Manly-Warringah Sea Eagles at Bluetongue Stadium in 2007.

In July 2010, Dureau was told by Knights coach Rick Stone that it would be in Dureau's best interests to find a new club for 2011, after the signing of young playmaker Beau Henry and the re-signing of Ben Rogers, plus players Jarrod Mullen and Kurt Gidley that also played in the halves.

Catalans Dragons 
Dureau signed with the Catalans Dragons for 2011. He started out at Catalans as the first choice halfback and played for three years with much individual and team success. He was named in the Super League Dream Team in 2011 and 2012, and in 2012 he was awarded the Albert Goldthorpe Medal.

Dureau missed much of the 2013 and 2014 seasons due to surgery to remove a benign tumour behind his eye.

Sydney Roosters
On 30 June 2014, Dureau signed with the Sydney Roosters mid-season on loan from the Catalans Dragons. However he failed to make an NRL appearance for the club.

Return to Catalans
In 2015, Dureau returned to the Catalans Dragons in the Super League. Dureau left the club at the end of the 2015 season and subsequently retired from the sport.

Coaching career
Following his retirement as a player, Dureau took up a coaching role with Newcastle Knights.

Career statistics

External links
2014 Sydney Roosters profile

References

1986 births
Living people
Australian people of French descent
Australian rugby league coaches
Australian rugby league players
Catalans Dragons players
Central Coast Centurions players
Exiles rugby league team players
Macquarie Scorpions players
Newcastle Knights players
Rugby league five-eighths
Rugby league halfbacks
Rugby league hookers
Rugby league players from Taree